Marie-Ange Nardi (born 2 April 1961 in Marseille) is a French television presenter for TF1. She began in television as a continuity announcer for France 3 Marseille while studying psychology in university, later becoming a national announcer with Antenne 2.

She has chiefly worked as a game show host, on Trivial Pursuit, Jeux Sans Frontières, Grain de Folie, Pyramide, Qui est qui ?, Tout vu Tout lu, and, beginning in 2006, La Cible.

While doing a news segment on television, she was attacked by a lion. She did not sustain serious injuries.

External links
  Marie-Ange Nardi on Stars Oubliées

1961 births
Living people
French television presenters
French women television presenters
Mass media people from Marseille
French game show hosts